The Masacre of San Miguel Canoa was a lynching that occurred in the village of San Miguel Canoa in Puebla, México on 14 September 1968. Enrique Meza Pérez, a right-wing priest, incited a mob of villagers to attack five mountain climbers who he believed were communists.

Incident
In September of 1968, five employees of the Autonomous University of Puebla decided to climb La Malinche, a mountain in central Mexico. However, due to adverse weather conditions, had to stay the night in the village San Miguel Canoa. Upon arriving, the local priest, Enrique Meza Pérez, called them communists and incited villagers to riot and kill the visitors. Two were killed in the attack and three sustained serious injuries, but survived.

Two weeks later, a related incident, the Tlatelolco massacre occurred in which around 400 people were killed by government forces.  The Tlatelolco massacre largely overshadowed coverage of the San Miguel Canoa Massacre. Most of the population spoke Nahuatl, and did not read or watch television, and were therefore unaware of the student movement of 1968.

Felipe Cazals directed a feature film about the event called Canoa: A Shameful Memory released in 1976.

The film is alluded to in the song "Iglesia de San Miguel Canoa" by Mexican group Los Macuanos.

References

1968 in Mexico
Massacres in Mexico
1968 murders in Mexico